Rahatul Ferdous (born 10 May 1995) is a Bangladeshi cricketer. He made his Twenty20 debut on 31 May 2021, for Brothers Union in the 2021 Dhaka Premier Division Twenty20 Cricket League.

References

External links
 

1995 births
Living people
Bangladeshi cricketers
People from Sylhet
Brothers Union cricketers
Mohammedan Sporting Club cricketers
Prime Doleshwar Sporting Club cricketers
Bangladesh East Zone cricketers